Angelika Express is a German pop and punk band. The band was formed in 2002 by Robert Drakogiannakis. It broke up in 2005, but reunited in 2008.

2002-2005
Formed by guitarist Robert Drakogiannakis, the original trio include Alex Jezdinsky on drums and Jens Bachmann on bass guitar. All three members sang. They signed to Wuppertal Music Label Group and released a debut self-titled album that received some attention on the independent music scene but failed to draw wide attention. In 2003, they released the EP Ich bin kein Amerikaner (eng. "I Am not an American"). 2004 saw the release of a second album, Alltag für Alle ("routine for all"), and another EP, Phantome ("Phantoms"). In 2005, the band released the live album Pornographie. The band had one television appearance on Newcomer TV in 2005 before separating, with the members joining other projects.

2008
In 2008, Drakogiannakis resumed the band as a solo project, providing all instrumentation, with support live on bass from Dani "das Bassmädchen" Hilterhaus (eng. "the bass girl"). Initially, live drum support was offered by Martell Beigang, but after Beigang's departure drum support has been supplied by Mirco "Caddy" Cardeneo and Valentin Mayr. Drakogiannakis released new songs through the Angelika Express blog until late August 2008 and then began financing the planned album Goldener Trash by pre-selling shares to fans, a marketing idea that drew attention from the Heute show on ZDF. In 2009, an EP entitled Was wollt ihr alle? ("What do you all want?") was published, with an internet video supporting it. At the end of 2009, Hosen runter! Die Angelika Demos 2002–2005 ("Pants Down! The Angelika Demos 2002-2005") was released as a free album on the internet.

Discography

Albums
Angelika Express (LP / CD, March 10, 2003)
Everyday life for all (LP / CD, March 29, 2004)
Pornography: A Night with Angelika Express Track 22 (CD live album, April 4, 2005)
Golden Trash (rough version for download on the homepage, 29 August 2008)
Golden Trash (13 February 2009)
The dark side of the Force (November 26, 2010, as a special limited edition with bonus CD, posters and T-Shirt)
The dark side of the Force (Part Two) (download only, 1 January 2011)

EPs
I am not an American (10 "/ CD, 24 November 2003)
Phantoms (CD, November 15, 2004)
What do you want them all? (CD, November 28, 2008)
Hands up (CD limited to 100 pieces with 10 bonus tracks / Download, 20 July 2010)

Singles
You go to Berlin (Maxi-CD 24 February 2003)
Actually, actually (Maxi-CD 26 May 2003)
Take me with you (7 "-Single/Maxi-CD, March 22, 2004)
Rock Fucker Rock (CD, 7 June 2004)

External links
Official site

Musical groups established in 2002
German punk rock groups
2002 establishments in Germany